The String Quartet No. 7 (D 94) in D major was composed by Franz Schubert in 1811 or 1812.

Movements
 Allegro (D major)
 Andante con moto (G major)
 Menuetto: Allegretto (D major, with Trio in B-flat major)
 Presto (D major)

Sources
 Franz Schubert's Works, Series V: Streichquartette edited by Joseph Hellmesberger and Eusebius Mandyczewski. Breitkopf & Härtel, 1890.
 Otto Erich Deutsch (and others). Schubert Thematic Catalogue (several editions), No. 94.
 New Schubert Edition, Series VI, Volume 3: Streichquartette I edited by Martin Chusid. Bärenreiter, 1979.

External links 
 

String Quartet No. 07
1810s works